The UK Singles Chart is one of many music charts compiled by the Official Charts Company that calculates the best-selling singles of the week in the United Kingdom. Before 2004, the chart was only based on the sales of physical singles. This list shows singles that peaked in the top 10 of the UK Singles Chart during 1963, as well as singles which peaked in 1962 and 1964 but were in the top 10 in 1963. The entry date is when the single appeared in the top 10 for the first time (week ending, as published by the Official Charts Company, which is six days after the chart is announced).

One-hundred and four singles were in the top ten in 1963. Nine singles from 1962 remained in the top 10 for several weeks at the beginning of the year, while "Dominique" by The Singing Nun, "Glad All Over" by The Dave Clark Five, "I Only Want to Be with You" by Dusty Springfield and "Twenty Four Hours From Tulsa" by Gene Pitney were all released in 1963 but did not reach their peak until 1964. "(Dance With The) Guitar Man" by Duane Eddy & the Rebelettes, "Rockin' Around the Christmas Tree" by Brenda Lee and "The Next Time"/"Bachelor Boy" by Cliff Richard and The Shadows were the singles from 1962 to reach their peak in 1963. Twenty-nine artists scored multiple entries in the top 10 in 1963.
The Beatles, The Dave Clark Five, Dusty Springfield, Gerry and the Pacemakers and The Searchers were among the many artists who achieved their first UK charting top 10 single in 1963.

The 1962 Christmas number-one, "Return to Sender" by Elvis Presley, remained at number one for the first week of 1963. The first new number-one single of the year was "The Next Time"/"Bachelor Boy" by Cliff Richard and The Shadows. Overall, seventeen different singles peaked at number-one in 1963, with The Beatles and Gerry and the Pacemakers (3) having the joint most singles hit that position.

Background

Gerry and the Pacemakers become first act to reach number-one with their first three singles
In 1963, Gerry and the Pacemakers became the very first act to reach number-one in the UK Singles Chart with their first three singles: "How Do You Do It?", "I Like It" and their cover of "You'll Never Walk Alone" from the musical Carousel. Only two other acts have managed to repeat this feat; Frankie Goes to Hollywood and Jive Bunny and the Mastermixers.

Multiple entries
One-hundred and four singles charted in the top 10 in 1963, with ninety-four singles reaching their peak this year.

Twenty-nine artists scored multiple entries in the top 10 in 1963. The Shadows secured the record for most top 10 hits in 1963 with nine hit singles, four of which were with Cliff Richard.

The Searchers were one of a number of artists with two top-ten entries, including the number-one single "Sweets for My Sweet". Del Shannon, Joe Brown and the Bruvvers, Kenny Lynch and Tommy Roe were among the other artists who had multiple top 10 entries in 1963.

Chart debuts
Thirty-seven artists achieved their first top 10 single in 1963, either as a lead or featured artist. Of these, eight went on to record another hit single that year: Brian Poole, The Crystals, Gerry and the Pacemakers, Kenny Lynch, Paul & Paula, The Searchers, The Springfields and The Tremeloes. Billy J. Kramer & The Dakotas, Dusty Springfield, Freddie and the Dreamers all had two more top 10 singles in 1963. The Beatles had three other entries in their breakthrough year.

The following table (collapsed on desktop site) does not include acts who had previously charted as part of a group and secured their first top 10 solo single.

Notes
Jet Harris and Tony Meehan scored three chart hits as a duo in 1963, including number-one single "Diamonds" in February. They had both been members of The Shadows (formerly The Drifters) since its inception, as well as joining The Vipers Skiffle Group before going solo. "Just Like Eddie" was Heinz's first foray into the chart under his own name, but he had been a bassist in The Tornados, the group debuting with the number-one hit "Telstar" at the end of 1962.

Songs from films
Original songs from various films entered the top 10 throughout the year. These included "Summer Holiday" (from Summer Holiday), "Theme from The Legion's Last Patrol (Concerto disperato)" (The Legion's Last Patrol), "She Loves You" (A Hard Day's Night), "You'll Never Walk Alone" (Carousel) and "Dominique" (The Singing Nun).

Additionally, a melody used in "Never on Sunday" was turned into a hit single recorded by Brenda Lee as "All Alone Am I". "Do You Want to Know a Secret?", written by Lennon-McCartney and performed by The Beatles and taken into the top 10 by Billy J. Kramer and The Dakotas, was inspired by the tune "I'm Wishing" from Snow White and the Seven Dwarves. "Secret Love" had first been heard in the 1953 film Calamity Jane, sang by Doris Day. Kathy Kirby took her cover version to number four. "María Elena" started as an instrumental featured in the film Bordertown.

Best-selling singles
Until 1970 there was no universally recognised year-end best-sellers list. However in 2011 the Official Charts Company released a list of the best-selling single of each year in chart history from 1952 to date. According to the list, "She Loves You" by The Beatles is officially recorded as the biggest-selling single of 1963. "She Loves You" (1) was also ranked as the best-selling single of the decade, while "I Want to Hold Your Hand" (2) also ranked in the top 10 best-selling singles of the 1960s. "She Loves You" also stands as the 8th biggest-selling single of all time in the UK (as of December 2017).

Top-ten singles
Key

Entries by artist

The following table shows artists who achieved two or more top 10 entries in 1963, including singles that reached their peak in 1962 or 1964. The figures include both main artists and featured artists. The total number of weeks an artist spent in the top ten in 1963 is also shown.

Notes

 "I Only Want to Be with You" reached its peak of number four on 15 January 1964 (week ending).
 "Glad All Over" reached its peak of number one on 22 January 1964 (week ending).
 "Dominique" reached its peak of number seven on 1 January 1964 (week ending).
 "Twenty Four Hours from Tulsa" reached its peak of number five on 8 January 1964 (week ending).
 "Telstar" re-entered the top 10 at number 10 on 23 January 1963 (week ending).
 "Let's Dance" re-entered the top 10 at number 10 on 2 January 1963 (week ending).
 "Island of Dreams" re-entered the top 10 at number 8 on 27 February 1963 (week ending) for 6 weeks.
 "Say Wonderful Things" was the United Kingdom's entry at the Eurovision Song Contest in 1963.
 "In Dreams" re-entered the top 10 at number 10 on 19 June 1963 (week ending).
"Losing You" re-entered the top 10 at number 10 on 29 May 1963 (week ending).
 "Welcome to My World" re-entered the top 10 at number 9 on 7 August 1963 (week ending).
 "Theme from The Legion's Last Patrol" re-entered the top 10 at number 10 on 18 September 1963 (week ending).
 "Applejack" re-entered the top 10 at number 9 on 16 October 1963 (week ending).
 "Wishing" re-entered the top 10 at number 10 on 16 October 1963 (week ending).
Figure includes single that first charted in 1962 but peaked in 1963.
 Figure includes single that peaked in 1962.
 Figure includes single that peaked in 1964.
 Figures includes two top 10 hits with the group The Springfields.
 Figures includes two top 10 hits with the group The Tornados.

See also
1963 in British music
List of number-one singles from the 1960s (UK)

References
General

Specific

External links
1963 singles chart archive at the Official Charts Company (click on relevant week)

Top 10 singles
United Kingdom
1963